Events from the year 1972 in Scotland.

Incumbents 

 Secretary of State for Scotland and Keeper of the Great Seal – Gordon Campbell

Law officers 
 Lord Advocate – Norman Wylie
 Solicitor General for Scotland – David Brand until November; then William Stewart

Judiciary 
 Lord President of the Court of Session and Lord Justice General – Lord Clyde until 25 April; then Lord Emslie
 Lord Justice Clerk – Lord Grant, then Lord Wheatley
 Chairman of the Scottish Land Court – Lord Birsay

Events 
 11 February – Rockall is formally claimed as part of Scotland. 
 24 May – Rangers F.C. wins the UEFA Cup Winners' Cup with a 3–2 win over Soviet side FC Dynamo Moscow in Barcelona.
 25 August – Kilbirnie Street fire in Glasgow: 7 firemen killed in a flashover.
 1 September – Raising of school-leaving age from fifteen to sixteen for pupils leaving school at the end of the academic year, in common with the rest of the UK.
 5 October – last ship launched at the former John Brown & Company Clydebank yard, Clyde-class bulk grain carrier MV Alisa.
 December – Gartnavel General Hospital opens in Glasgow.
 Anderston Centre opens in Glasgow.
 Wendy Wood stages a hunger strike for home rule.
 Highland Wildlife Park opened near Kingussie to display native species.
 Loch Lomond Bear Park opened near Balloch to display bears.
 The West Highland Free Press newspaper is founded at Broadford, Skye.
 Hamilton Academy closes (founded 1588)

Births 
 23 January – Ewen Bremner, actor
 20 February – Neil Primrose, musician
 25 March – Phil O'Donnell, footballer (died 2007)
 8 April – Lisa Cameron, Scottish National Party Member of Parliament for East Kilbride, Strathaven and Lesmahagow, 2015- , and clinical psychologist
 9 April – Neve McIntosh, actress
 10 April – Gordon Buchanan, wildlife film-maker
 1 May – Patrick Grant, men's fashion designer
 15 May – Danny Alexander, Liberal Democrat Member of Parliament for Inverness, Nairn, Badenoch & Strathspey, 2005–15
 2 August – Carol Monaghan, Scottish National Party Member of Parliament for Glasgow North West, 2015-
 16 August – Frankie Boyle, comedian
 17 August – David Ralph, field hockey forward
 14 September – Jenny Colgan, novelist
 2 October – John Anderson, footballer
 20 October – Debbie McLeod, field hockey goalkeeper
 29 November – Willie Bain, Scottish Labour Party politician and Member of Parliament for Glasgow North East, 2009-

Deaths 

 15 March – Jimmy Simpson, international footballer (born 1908)
 28 March – Duncan Campbell, revivalist (born 1898)
 4 June – David Ross Lauder, recipient of the Victoria Cross (born 1894)
 19 November – William Grant, Lord Grant, serving Lord Justice Clerk and former Lord Advocate (born 1909)
 30 November – Compton Mackenzie, novelist and Scottish nationalist (born 1883 in West Hartlepool)
 27 December – John Kerr, cricketer (born 1885)
 Jimmy MacBeath, folk singer (born 1894)

The arts
 George Mackay Brown's novel Greenvoe is published.
 Bill Bryden's play Willie Rough is staged by the Royal Lyceum Theatre in Edinburgh.
 The Average White Band is formed in Dundee.
 The pipe band of the Royal Scots Dragoon Guards release their instrumental recording of "Amazing Grace" which reaches No. 1 in the UK Singles Chart in April.

See also 
 1972 in Northern Ireland

References 

 
Scotland
Years of the 20th century in Scotland
1970s in Scotland